Mike Schultz may refer to:

 Mike Schultz (2000s pitcher) (born 1979), baseball player
 Mike Schultz (1940s pitcher) (1920–2004), baseball player
 Mike Schultz (American football) (born 1958), American football coach
 Mike Schultz (politician) (born 1950), American politician from Utah
 Mike Schultz (snowboarder) (born 1981), Paralympic snowboarder